The article includes information on the composition of the Russian government headed by Viktor Zubkov, which functioned from 17 September 2007 to 8 May 2008.

Ministers

References

Zubkov
2007 establishments in Russia
2008 disestablishments in Russia
Cabinets established in 2007
Cabinets disestablished in 2008